Carved Records is an American record label operating out of Dallas, Texas, that began operation in 2009.

History
Carved Records was founded by CEO Tim Porter (after a career in many non-music business ventures) and Vice President of Operations Phil Thomas (a music industry veteran with over 20 years in the music business). Since forming in 2009, the label has released six albums and one compilation album.

In 2012, Carved Records secured a new distribution deal with EMI, and deals with The Orchard and Cargo for worldwide distribution.

Artists
, Carved Records have two significant bands on the label.

 Texas Hippie Coalition
The band Texas Hippie Coalition (THC) was brought to the label’s attention early because of their own self-generated success. THC had been on the road consistently playing with bands they had grown up idolizing. They had found supportive fans in the form of music lovers, gear companies and corporate sponsors. THC met with Carved in late 2009. Shortly thereafter, Texas Hippie Coalition was the first band signed to Carved Records. They released their first national album, Rollin''' on July 6, 2010 via Carved Records. On August 14, 2013, THC released their third studio album, "Peacemaker".

 Tyler Bryant
In February 2012, Carved Records signed Tyler Bryant & the Shakedown.  Said CEO Tim Porter: “Once we witnessed a live performance, adding Tyler to the Carved family was a priority. Not only is Tyler extremely talented, he has surrounded himself with equally as talented band mates. These guys are the real deal and everyone at Carved is very excited to be working with them.” On January 22, 2013, Tyler Bryant & the Shakedown released their first full-length album, "Wild Child".

 The Boot Campaign 
Carved Records has partnered with "The Boot Campaign", a non-profit organization dedicated to easing the transitions of returning military from overseas.  Their slogan, "get YOUR boots on" implies a need for civilians to put yourself in the position of our troops.  Carved Records will be releasing a compilation album benefiting The Boot Campaign entitled When They Come Back...We Give Back.  The album features Texas Country artists giving their time and music to support The Boot Campaign.  Artists featured on the compilation include Carved Records' own No Justice, Robert Earl Keen Derek Sholl, Wade Bowen, Stoney LaRue, Micky and the Motorcars, Jason Boland and the Stragglers, Eli Young Band, Randy Rogers Band, Kevin Fowler, Aaron Watson, Reckless Kelly, Cross Canadian Ragweed, Bleu Edmondson, and Jack Ingram.  The album was released September 14, 2010.

 Carved Records Releases 
 Texas Hippie Coalition: Rollin' – July 6, 2010
 No Justice:  2nd Avenue – July 6, 2010
 Juke Kartel:  Levolution – September 28, 2010
 The Boot Campaign Compilation:  When They Come Back...We Give Back'' – September 14, 2010
 HURT: "The Crux" – May 1, 2012
 Texas Hippie Coalition: "Peacemaker" – August 14, 2012
 Tyler Bryant & the Shakedown: "Wild Child" – January 22, 2013

References

External links
 
 

American independent record labels